Taree Airport  is an airport  northeast of the city of Taree, New South Wales, Australia. Taree is on the Mid North Coast, less than a four-hour drive from Sydney. The airport no longer maintains any scheduled services.

Airport facilities
Taree is currently set to expand the airport to provide more facilities for pilots, businesses and airlines alike, This is also expected to boost the airports presence.

A number of businesses including aircraft manufacturers and fabricators, an aircraft restorer and a skydiving school are based at Taree Airport.

Airlines and destinations 

FlyPelican operated services between Taree and Sydney until July 2022, when removal of government grants and rising fuel prices made the service unviable.

See also
List of airports in New South Wales

References

External links
Mid-Coast Council
Regional Express Airlines

Airports in New South Wales
Taree